Ajay Kumar Singh is an Indian politician who served as a Member of the Bihar Legislative Assembly from the Raxaul representing the Bharatiya Janata Party in 2010 and 2015.

References

Living people
People from East Champaran district
Bharatiya Janata Party politicians from Bihar
Bihar MLAs 2010–2015
Bihar MLAs 2015–2020
Janata Dal (United) politicians
1970 births